The Zimbabwe National Roads Administration (ZINARA) is a Zimbabwean parastatal responsible for the management, maintenance and development of Zimbabwe's national road network.

Background
The Zimbabwe National Road Administration (ZINARA)
falls under the Ministry of Transport, Communication and Infrastructural Development and was established in August 2001, in terms of the Roads Act of 2001 with the aim of enhancing road network system throughout the Zimbabwe.

ZINARA's vision and mission is to become a world class road manager, providing secure, stable and adequate reservoir of funds, to fund effectively maintenance of the national road network through fixing, collection, disbursement and monitoring of funds usage for preservation, enhancement and sustainable development.

Governance
ZINARA is run under the Ministry of Transport, Communication and Infrastructural Development

ZINARA consists of a part-time Board of Directors which serves for a three-year period, and a full-time CEO. It has 12 board members and 7 senior managers in 7 departments.

Board Members 
ZINARA Board Members as of Monday, 8 October 2019 were 12 members:
 
•	The Board Chairman

•	The Vice - Board Chairman

•	The 10 Board Members

Executive team 
The ZINARA Executive team as on Monday, 28 October 2019 were as follows:
 
•	Mr. Nkosinathi Ncube (CEO)

•	Mr. G. Moyo (Director: Administration)

•	Mrs. V. Muzite (Company Secretary)

Road Authorities
The Zimbabwe National Roads Administration (ZINARA) is responsible for managing the Road Fund and disbursing the local road authorities. 
The local road authorities are:

•	The Department of Roads in the Ministry of Transport and Infrastructure Development which is responsible for trunk roads.

•	The Urban Councils responsible for urban roads.

•	The Rural District Councils (RDC) and the District Development Fund (DDF) which are responsible rural roads.

Road Network
The road network excluding urban roads totals 76,241 km of which
9,256 km or 12.1% are bitumen surfaced.

Road Network Thursday, 1 November 2012 10:31 Most of these roads are more than 30 years and therefore requires complete rehabilitation works. ZINARA has in the past 9 years been able to fund the routine and periodic maintenance countrywide.

Road Categories
Classified roads fall under three categories.

1.	Regional Trunk Road Network (RTRN): 
Roads linking countries within southern African region.

2.	Secondary Roads: 
Those roads that connect regional, primary, tertiary and urban roads, industrial and mining centers, tourist attractions and minor border posts are the secondary roads. 
 
3.	Tertiary Roads:
Those roads which provide access to schools, health centers, dip tanks and other service facilities within a rural district council area or connect and provide access to secondary, primary and regional roads.

Total Road Network in Zimbabwe is 87,654 km which include the paved or unpaved, the urban, rural and state roads.

•	State Highways 18,460 km

•	Urban Roads 8,194 km

•	Rural Roads 61,000 km

Road Names
Road and Route numbers in Zimbabwe may differ depending on the route concerned.

Previously, national routes were denoted with the letter "A" followed by a number indicating the specific route. Today the "A" numbers are just Map Reference Numbers known by not much of the populace. (The term "national road" is frequently used to refer to a national route, but technically a "national road" is any road overseen by the ZINARA. A national road need not necessarily form part of a national route. )

Today primary roads on Zimbabwe are denoted with the letter "P" followed by a number indicating the specific route. 
Primary roads which are regional road corridors are denoted with the letter "R" followed by a number indicating the internal regional road corridor.

Unlike in South Africa where routes are clearly numbered and labeled as such, most roads in Zimbabwe are publicly known by their common names or destinations.

Zimbabwe “A” Highways (1975)
SOURCES:
[Automobile Association Map 1975]

[Map 9.2 Road Transport Network of Zimbabwe.]

Primary Roads (Ordinary)

Source: [Map 9.2 Road Transport Network of Zimbabwe.]

Regional Road Corridors
Source: [Map 9.2 Road Transport Network of Zimbabwe.]

SADC Regional Trunk Road Network
Zimbabwe being a member state of SADC, ZINARA works in conjunction with other regional road authorities and it does its part on regional road corridors passing through Zimbabwe.

Regional Trunk Roads Network in Zimbabwe in proportion of total regional trunk roads are as follows:
 
•	Reference Roads: 1 600 km (Regional total 29 300 km)

•	Intermediate Roads: 1 000 km (Regional total 11 600 km)

•	Branch, Link and Connecting Roads: 1 100 km (Regional total 21 700 km)

•	Total 3 700 km (Regional total 62 600 km)

•	Regional Percentage: 6% (Regional total 100%)

So ZINARA does only 6% of regional trunk roads.

(Source: Revised RIDMP Draft -Annexure 5.6 – Roads.)

SADC Numbered Roads
The regional organization, Southern African Development Community has its own numbered routes which usually are a combination of multiple roads across one or more member countries.

The Southern African Development Community Regional Trunk Road Network (SADC-RTRN) is a system of numbered road corridors in Southern Africa. The most important part of the network is the reference roads, which are major trans-regional routes.

Operations
ZINARA’s core business, in consultations with the minister of transport, communication and infrastructural development is fixing road user charges and collect such charges or any other revenue of the road fund.

The Zimbabwe National Roads Administration (ZINARA)

•	Fixes the levels of road user charges (RUC).

•	Collects RUC as well as other revenue of the Road Fund.

•	Sets maintenance, design, construction and technical standards.

•	Monitors adherence to such standards by Road Authorities.

•	Allocates and disburse to road authorities funds from the Road Fund in accordingly.

•	Audits the use of funds from the Road Fund.

•	Monitors implementation of road maintenance works by Road Authorities.

•	Assists Road Authorities in making annual or multi-year road maintenance rolling plans.

Road Fund 
The Road Fund was established in terms of the Roads Act of 2001 with the objective to provide a stable, adequate, secure and sustainable source of funding for road maintenance work in Zimbabwe. 
The Road Fund comes from, Road user charges, Appropriations from Parliament and Grants. The fund is then used for routine and periodic road maintenance of roads and other roads related projects approved by the ZINARA Board.
 
The main source of ZINARA funds are the vehicle licence fees (30%), fuel levy (28%), toll roads (21%) and transit fees (19%). Toll roads fees could be the main contributor now because the toll gates have risen from 23 as of 2011 to 36 as of December 2015 nationwide.

International Transit Tolls
International transit tolls are collected from foreign buses and heavy goods vehicles at border posts as they enter Zimbabwe. These cross-border charges are levied according to the distance each vehicle is to travel while inside Zimbabwe.
International transit coupons are purchased in advance in foreign currency, and the revenue is paid to ZINARA. Each transit vehicle along the RTRN is issued a permit which states the destination of that particular vehicle. 
Local and foreign light motor vehicles, as well as on local heavy motor vehicles entering Zimbabwe except those with coupons paid in advance, are levied with the Road Access Toll at all border posts. A flat rate, in cash, is charged in accordance with the vehicle category.

Toll Gates
Most highways linking cities are now toll roads following the construction of 36 toll plazas throughout the country.  These are State of art tollgates are the first in the world to be 100% self-sufficient and solar powered.

Toll Points Table

(Soueces)
BigSky.co.zw

See also
•	Transport in Zimbabwe

•	Ministry of Transport, Communication and Infrastructural Development

       Trans-African Highway Network

References

Transport infrastructure in Zimbabwe
Roads in Zimbabwe
2001 establishments in Zimbabwe
Government-owned companies of Zimbabwe